Tafi Atome Monkey Sanctuary is a traditional sacred grove conservation established in 1993 under the direction of a Peace Corps Volunteer as a community-based ecotourism project. Tafi Atome is the home of Mona and Patas monkeys.

Location
The sanctuary is located about 230 kilometers Northeast of the capital Accra and 43 kilometers south of Hohoe in the Volta region of Ghana.

History
For the past two centuries, the monkeys are found living in the tropical forest around the small village of Tafi-Atome and have been sacred because it was believed they were messengers from the gods. In 1996, the village began broader efforts to protect their forest and monkeys, as well as to offer tours for visitors. The sanctuary was created by a coalition of villagers, public institutions and NGO. As a result of these efforts, the monkey population has increased, and the forest with its many species of birds and butterflies has been preserved.

Upgrade of facilities 
In November 2020, an upgrade which included a new tourist reception area, a modern 7-seater washroom, three (3)  pavilions for visitors, a fence of wire mesh and bamboo around the site, painting of the edifices and structures, a car park and paved grounds was commissioned.

References 

Protected areas of Ghana

Tourism in Ghana
Wildlife sanctuaries
Sacred groves